The de Havilland Engine Company was an offshoot of the de Havilland aircraft building company, which started life as the 'Engine Division of the de Havilland Aircraft Company' in 1926 producing the famous de Havilland Gipsy aero-engine. The company was merged with Bristol Siddeley (BSEL) engines in 1961 with BSEL subsequently becoming part of Rolls-Royce Limited in 1968.

History
The company was officially formed at Stag Lane in February 1944 and later moved into a factory leased by the government in 1946 at Leavesden, which had earlier been a site for Handley Page Halifax production. This is now the location of Leavesden Film Studios.

It went on to produce one of the early turbojet engines the de Havilland Goblin which saw service in the early post-war de Havilland Vampire fighter.
The later Ghost turbojet propelled early versions of the de Havilland Comet jetliner and the de Havilland Venom fighter.

The company later developed the de Havilland Gnome turboshaft under licence from the General Electric T58 design, but the company was absorbed into Bristol Siddeley Engines Limited (BSEL) in 1961; Bristol Siddeley itself subsequently merged with Rolls-Royce Limited in 1968 and the merged company continued with the "Rolls-Royce" name.

Engines

Piston engines

de Havilland Ghost
de Havilland Gipsy
de Havilland Gipsy Minor
de Havilland Gipsy Major
de Havilland Gipsy Six
de Havilland Gipsy Queen
de Havilland Gipsy Twelve
de Havilland Gipsy King

Turbojets
de Havilland Ghost
de Havilland Goblin
de Havilland Gyron
de Havilland Gyron Junior

Turboshafts
de Havilland Gnome
Rolls-Royce Gem

Rocket engines
de Havilland Sprite
de Havilland Super Sprite
de Havilland Spectre

See also

References

 Gunston, Bill. World Encyclopedia of Aero Engines. Cambridge, England. Patrick Stephens Limited, 1989. 
 Lumsden, Alec. British Piston Engines and their Aircraft. Marlborough, Wiltshire: Airlife Publishing, 2003. .

External links

British Jet Engine Website
 History of de Havilland

 
Aircraft industry in London
Companies based in Watford
De Havilland
de Havilland Engine Company
Rocket engine manufacturers of the United Kingdom